Holmiodiscus is a genus of fungi in the family Helotiaceae. This is a monotypic genus, containing the single species Holmiodiscus filipendulae.

References

External links
Holmiodiscus at Index Fungorum

Helotiaceae
Monotypic Ascomycota genera